Sydänjuuret is the seventh studio album by the Finnish thrash metal band Mokoma, that was released on March 24, 2010. It has once reached top position in the Finnish albums chart.

Track listings

Personnel
 Kuisma Aalto – guitar, backing vocals
 Marko Annala – vocals, backing vocals
 Janne Hyrkäs – drums
 Santtu Hämäläinen – bass
 Tuomo Saikkonen – guitar

References

2010 albums
Mokoma albums